Julie S. Vargas (born 1938 in Minneapolis, Minnesota) is an educator who has written extensively on the science of behavior.

Vargas is the daughter of B.F. Skinner and is the president of the B. F. Skinner Foundation, in Cambridge, Massachusetts. She is an officer of The International Society for Behaviorology.

Biography
Vargas received a bachelor's degree in music from Radcliffe College, a master's degree in music education from Columbia University and a Ph.D. in educational research from the University of Pittsburgh. She was a faculty member at West Virginia University, where she and her husband, Ernest A. Vargas, taught for more than 30 years in the College of Human Resources and Education.

Behaviorology: Skinner's new science
Vargas has written that "What B. F. Skinner began is not an 'approach', 'view', 'discipline', 'field', or 'theory'. It was, and is, a science, differing from psychology in its dependent variables, its measurement system, its procedures, and its analytic framework". She and a number of her colleagues have given Skinner's science the name "behaviorology", which may be defined as the natural science of the behavior of organisms.

Bibliography
Writing Worthwhile Behavioral Objectives, 1973, Harper & Row
Behavioral Psychology for Teachers, 1977, Harper & Row
 
 

Her more recent publications have been articles, including two 2005 entries on B. F. Skinner in volumes I and III of The Encyclopedia of Behavior Modification and Cognitive Behavior Therapy, and Behavior Analysis for Effective Teaching. with Routledge, Taylor and Francis, 2012.

References

External links
B. F. Skinner Foundation

1938 births
Living people
American non-fiction writers
Radcliffe College alumni
Teachers College, Columbia University alumni
University of Pittsburgh alumni
Writers from Minneapolis
West Virginia University faculty